Two ships of the Royal Navy have been named HMS Teviot:

  was a  launched in 1903 and sold for scrap in 1919
  was a  launched in 1942 and transferred to South Africa as HMSAS Teviot in 1945. Returned to the Royal Navy in 1946 and scrapped in 1955

Royal Navy ship names